Berndt Stephan "Ben" Blaisse (8 May 1911, Amsterdam – 30 April 2006, The Hague) was a Dutch speed skater and physicist.

He became a professor at the Delft University of Technology. He was expert in the field of physics at extremely low temperatures.

He made his international competitive debut in 1932 in the European Speed Skating Championships. In 1936 he qualified at the selection trials in Davos for the Olympics in Garmisch-Partenkirchen. He competed on the 500 meter distance and earned a 27th place with a time of 46.9 seconds.

He was the uncle of rower Steven Blaisse, who won a silver medal at the 1964 Summer Olympics.

Sources

Ben Blaisse overleden, Zen en de kunst van het schaatsenrijden 

1911 births
2006 deaths
Dutch male speed skaters
20th-century Dutch physicists
Academic staff of the Delft University of Technology
Speed skaters at the 1936 Winter Olympics
Olympic speed skaters of the Netherlands
Sportspeople from Amsterdam